Jeffrey Martin Hill (born September 24, 1972) is a former American football wide receiver in the National Football League who played for the Cincinnati Bengals. He played college football for the Purdue Boilermakers.

References

1972 births
Living people
American football wide receivers
American football running backs
American football return specialists
Cincinnati Bengals players
Purdue Boilermakers football players
People from Mount Healthy, Ohio